Newton Aycliffe Leisure Centre is a multi-sport venue and leisure facility, located in Newton Aycliffe, County Durham. The centre was opened in 1974 and has facilities for swimming, exercise, an indoor climbing wall, and a main sports hall for sports such as basketball, badminton and indoor football.

The main hall is used as the home venue for British Basketball League team Durham Wildcats, who have been using the venue consistently since 2007 having previously been based in Spennymoor. The venue has a maximum capacity for 1,200 people, with bleacher-style seating on three sides of the court.

See also
Durham Wildcats

References

Basketball venues in England
Sports venues in County Durham
Newton Aycliffe